Notes from Below is a UK-based digital magazine, founded in 2018, that publishes "workers' inquiries" and contemporary class analyses. The editors, including Jamie Woodcock and Callum Cant, have modeled their work after the Italian journal Quaderni Rossi and early surveys about working conditions conducted by Karl Marx. Through the inquiries it publishes, the magazine promotes class consciousness and workerism. The inquiries featured in the magazine have included workers at call centers, Amazon delivery centers, universities, tech companies, and pubs and its coverage has focused on small, militant unions like the Independent Workers' Union of Great Britain.

In 2020, Notes from Below was awarded a grant from the Barry Amiel & Norman Melburn Trust to produce a special issue. Notes from Below had contributed to a 2018 University and College Union (UCU) pension strike by publishing bulletins and circulating an open letter in support of the strike. Notes from Below members were later criticized in 2020 for misrepresenting  ongoing UCU negotiations as undemocratic.

Bibliography

See also
 Historical Materialism (journal)

References

Socialist magazines
Magazines established in 2018
Marxist magazines